The Expedition of 'Abdullah ibn 'Atik also known as the Assassination of Abu Rafi' ibn Abi Al-Huqaiq, took place in March, AD 627.

Background
Sallam ibn Abu al-Huqayq (Abu Rafi) was a Jew, who aided and abetted the pagan enemies of the Muslims by provisioning and financing them, and denigrating Muhammad with his poetry (hija').  When the Muslims had settled their affair with Banu Quraiza's betrayal of the Muslims in Medina, the Al-Khazraj tribe, a rival of Al-Aws, asked for Muhammad's permission to kill him in order to merit a virtue equal to that of Al-Aws who had killed Ka'b ibn al-Ashraf.

Assassination
According to the Sealed Nectar, a group of 5 men from the Banu Khazraj tribe with ‘Abdullah bin ‘Ateeq at their head, headed for Khaybar where ‘Abu Rafi’s fort was situated. When they approached the fortress, ‘Abdullah advised his men to stay a little behind, then went ahead disguised in his cloak, as if he had been relieving himself. When the people of the fort went in, the gate-keeper called him to enter thinking he was one of them. ‘Abdullah went in and lurked inside. He then began to unbolt the doors leading to Salam’s room. There it was absolutely dark but he managed to put him to the sword, and then leave in safety. On his way back, his leg broke so he wrapped it up in a band, and hid in a secret place until morning when someone stood on the wall and announced the death of Salam bin Abi Al-Huqaiq officially. On hearing this news he left and went to see Muhammad, who listened to the whole story, and then asked ‘Abdullah to stretch his leg, which he wiped and the fracture healed on the spot according to Muslim scholar Saifur Rahman al Mubarakpuri. In another version, all five of the group participated in the  killing. This incident took place in Dhul Qa‘dah or Dhul Hijjah in the year five Hijri.

William Muir also claims five people were sent, 'Abdullah ibn 'Atik who was familiar with the language of the Banu Nadir, addressed Al-Huqaiq's wife, who came to open the door, entering on a false pretext. Muir also mentions that according to one account, he pretended he brought a present for her husband. When his wife saw they were armed, she began to scream and they started to aim their weapons at her, forcing her to be silent "at the peril of her life". They then rushed in and killed Al-Huqaiq (Abu Rafi).

Islamic primary sources

In his biography of Muhammad, the Muslim historian Tabari mentions the event as follows:

Abu Rafi's assassination is mentioned in many Sunni Hadith:

See also
List of expeditions of Muhammad

References

Notes
. Note: This is the free version available on Google Books
, Original from: Harvard University (according to Google books).

627
Campaigns ordered by Muhammad